APC, WNT signaling pathway regulator is a protein that in humans is encoded by the APC gene.

Function

This gene encodes a tumor suppressor protein that acts as an antagonist of the Wnt signaling pathway. It is also involved in other processes including cell migration and adhesion, transcriptional activation, and apoptosis. Defects in this gene cause familial adenomatous polyposis (FAP), an autosomal dominant pre-malignant disease that usually progresses to malignancy. Disease-associated mutations tend to be clustered in a small region designated the mutation cluster region (MCR) and result in a truncated protein product. [provided by RefSeq, Jul 2008].

References

Further reading